Philip Odera is an economist, businessman and bank executive in Kenya, the largest economy in the East African Community. He is the current designate managing director and chief executive officer of CfC Stanbic Bank Limited, a Kenyan financial institution, with total assets valued at approximately US$2 billion (KES:180.51 billion), as of December 2013. Prior to that, from 2007 until 2014, he served as the CEO and managing director of Stanbic Bank Uganda, the largest commercial bank in Uganda.

Background and education
Odera was born in Maseno, Kisumu County, in the former Nyanza Province in western Kenya, circa 1961. He attended local schools before he relocated to the United States for further studies. He holds the degree of Bachelor of Arts in Economics from St. Lawrence University in New York State. He also holds the degree of Master of Business Administration majoring in Finance, from Suffolk University in Massachusetts.

Career
Prior to 2007, Philip Odera worked with Stanbic IBTC Bank, a large banking institution in Nigeria, with total assets valued in excess of NGN:763 billion (US$3.74 billion), as of December 2013. Stanbic IBTC Bank is a subsidiary of Standard Bank of South Africa. From 2007 until 2014, he served as the managing director and CEO of Stanbic Bank Uganda, the country's largest commercial bank by assets. In February 2015, he was appointed by the board of directors at CfC Stanbic Holdings to become the new CEO, pending regulatory approval by the Central Bank of Kenya.

See also
Standard Bank
Stanbic Bank
Stanbic Bank Uganda
List of banks in Kenya

References

External links
  Webpage of CfC Stanbic Bank
  Why Talent Is A Major Concern for African CEOs

Living people
1961 births
20th-century Kenyan economists
21st-century Kenyan economists
Kenyan bankers
Suffolk University alumni
St. Lawrence University alumni